Blackhawk is an unincorporated community in Warren County, in the U.S. state of Ohio. A variant spelling is "Black Hawk".

History
Black Hawk was platted in 1838. The community has the name of Black Hawk, an Indian chieftain.

References

Unincorporated communities in Warren County, Ohio